Several plutonium borides can be formed by direct combination of plutonium and boron powders in an inert atmosphere at reduced pressure.

PuB was reported to form at 1200 °C with a range of 40–70% boron. It supposedly has a Pu-B bond length of 2.46 Å and the NaCl structure, as do TiB, ZrB and HfB. The existence of PuB was contested later based on several arguments.

PuB2 is formed at 800 °C and has a similar structure to most other metal diborides.

At 1200 °C with 70–85% boron, mixtures of PuB4 and PuB6 are formed, with more of the latter as the temperature increases; PuB4 has the  tetragonal structure (same as UB4), and PuB6 has cubic structure, same as all hexaborides (CaB6, LaB6 etc.).

The most remarkable plutonium boride is arguably PuB100. Its existence demonstrates the importance of contamination in boride research because as little as 1% of an impurity is capable of changing its crystal structure.

References 

Borides
Plutonium compounds